Lin Bosheng (1902 – October 8, 1946) was a politician of the Republic of China. He was born in Maoming, Guangdong. He was executed in Nanjing for collaboration with the Empire of Japan.

References

Bibliography
 
 
 

1902 births
1946 deaths
Republic of China politicians from Guangdong
Executed Chinese collaborators with Imperial Japan
Executed people from Guangdong
Kuomintang collaborators with Imperial Japan
Politicians from Maoming
Executed Republic of China people
People executed by the Republic of China